Bendena is an unincorporated community in Doniphan County, Kansas, United States.  As of the 2020 census, the population of the community and nearby areas was 117.

History
Bendena was founded in 1886. It was originally given the name of Albers, after John Albers, who farmed on this land. But when the United States Postal Service established a post office there, they required a change of name because of similarities to other town names in Kansas.  It was then named for the sweetheart of the first telegraph operator at the Chicago, Kansas and Nebraska railroad station.

The first post office in Bendena was established in January, 1888.  Its ZIP Code is 66008.

Geography
Bendena is located southwest of the center of Doniphan County, along highway K-20.

Demographics

For statistical purposes, the United States Census Bureau has defined Bendena as a census-designated place (CDP).

The community is part of the St. Joseph, MO–KS Metropolitan Statistical Area.

Education
The community is served by Doniphan West USD 111 public school district.

References

Further reading

External links
 Doniphan County maps: Current, Historic, KDOT

Census-designated places in Doniphan County, Kansas
Census-designated places in Kansas
St. Joseph, Missouri metropolitan area
1886 establishments in Kansas
Populated places established in 1886